Mass media in Portugal includes a variety of online, print, and broadcast formats, such as radio, television, newspapers, and magazines. In the 20th century the Portuguese government censored the media, until the "1976 constitution guaranteed freedom of the press."

Newspapers

As of 2017 major newspapers in Portugal include Correio da Manhã, Expresso, Jornal de Notícias, Observador and Público.

Magazines

Radio

Television

See also
 Telecommunications in Portugal
 Autoridade Nacional de Comunicações (est. 1981)
 Cinema of Portugal
 Portuguese literature

References

Bibliography

in English
 Traquina, Nelson (1990) Media Concentration in Portugal, European Institute for the Media files, Manchester.
  
  
   2009?

in Portuguese
 
 Agee, Warren K. and Nelson Traquina (1984) O Quarto Poder Frustrado: Os Meios de Comunicação Social no Portugal Pós-Revolucionário [Media in Post-Revolutionary Portugal], Lisboa, Vega.

External links
 
 

 
Portugal
Portugal